Mahapurusha Srimanta Sankaradeva Viswavidyalaya  is a university established through The Mahapurusha Srimanta Sankaradeva Viswavidyalaya Act, 2013 in the State of Assam, India in 2013. The university is located in Nagaon and is named after him.

History
 

Mahapurusha Srimanta Sankaradeva (1449-1568) worked in diverse fields like religion, literature, music, dance, drama, architecture, and social reconstruction. He translated most of the Bhâgavata Mahapurana into the Assamese language and was the first playwright in any Indian language other than Sanskrit. He wrote more than twenty six scriptures mostly in the Assamese language besides the Brajawali form and one in Sanskrit. He  composed lyrics/songs including the Borgeets.

Srimanta Sankaradeva Sangha was set up in 1930 in order to carry forward the reforms initiated by the saint. It is the largest NGO in North East India and it has been working relentlessly among the masses for inculcating the values preached by Srimanta Sankaradeva. It runs several schools in the state.

The Sangha envisaged to establish a university and authorised its Srimanta Sankaradeva Education and Socio-Economic Development Trust, Nagaon to sponsor its establishment of the university. The Sangha submitted a proposal to the government of Assam for the establishment of the university under the Assam Private Universities Act, 2007. The Assam Legislative Assembly passed ‘The Mahapurusha Srimanta Sankaradeva Viswavidyalaya Act, 2013’. The Act of the Assam Legislative Assembly (Assam Act No. XIX of 2013) received the assent of the Governor of Assam vide : No. LGL.59/2013/16 and notified it in the Assam Gazette No. 351 dated 14 August 2013.

The Mahâpurusha Srimanta Sankaradeva Viswavidyâlaya was formally founded on 10 June 2014. It is located at Nagaon, the place blessed with the dust of the saint's feet for more than half a century, since he lived half of his life at Bardowa, Nagaon.

Departments
The university comprises the following departments:

 In Nagaon campus
 Department of  Assamese
 Department of  Computer Application
 Department of Economics
 Department of Education
 Department of  English
 Department of Philosophy
 Department of Sociology
 Department of Sankaradeva Studies

 In Guwahati campus
 Department of  English
 Department of  Juridical Studies
 Department of Performing Arts
 Department of Social Work
 Department of  Yogic Science & Naturopathy

References

External links
 

Universities in Assam
Nagaon district
2013 establishments in Assam
Educational institutions established in 2013